Sutorius magnificus, known until 2014 as Boletus magnificus, is a species of bolete fungus in the family Boletaceae native to Yunnan province in China. It was transferred to the new genus Neoboletus in 2014, and then Sutorius in 2016.

References

External links

Fungi described in 1948
Fungi of China